David Secher is a specialist in research commercialisation.  He was awarded the Queen's Award for Enterprise Promotion in 2007 for his work as the co-founder and chairman of Praxis (now PraxisAuril, of which he is now Patron) and the first chief executive of the N8 Group, a group of universities in the north of England. He is now the Principal of Cambridge Knowledge Transfer (a KT and Interim Management consultancy company); and a Life Fellow of Gonville and Caius College, Cambridge.  He is also a non-executive director of Crossword Cybersecurity plc and the Chair of Fitzwilliam Museum Enterprises Ltd.  He is an elected member of the University of Cambridge Finance Committee.

References

Queen's Award for Enterprise Promotion (2007)
British businesspeople
Fellows of Gonville and Caius College, Cambridge
Living people
Year of birth missing (living people)